Galbshtadt is a rural locality (a selo) and the administrative center of Galbshtadtsky Selsoviet and Nemetsky National District, Altai Krai, Russia. The population was 1750 as of 2016. There are 15 streets.

Geography 
The village is located within the Kulunda Plain, 430 km west of Barnaul.

Ethnicity 
The village is inhabited by Russians and Germans.

See also 
 Azovo, Omsk Oblast

References 

Rural localities in Nemetsky National District